Lee Hye-in (born 16 January 1995) is a South Korean fencer. She competed in the 2020 Summer Olympics and was part of the South Korean team that won a silver medal in women's team épée fencing.

References

1995 births
Living people
Fencers at the 2020 Summer Olympics
South Korean female fencers
Olympic fencers of South Korea
Olympic medalists in fencing
Medalists at the 2020 Summer Olympics
Olympic silver medalists for South Korea
Asian Games medalists in fencing
Asian Games silver medalists for South Korea
Medalists at the 2018 Asian Games
Fencers at the 2018 Asian Games
21st-century South Korean women
World Fencing Championships medalists